Sociocultural anthropology is a portmanteau used to refer to social anthropology and cultural anthropology together. It is one of the four main branches of anthropology. Sociocultural anthropologists focus on the study of society and culture, while often interested in cultural diversity and universalism.

Sociocultural anthropologists recognise a change in the nature of the field and as a previous centralisation on traditional tribal perspective has shifted to a contemporary understanding. Methodologies have altered accordingly, and the discipline continues to evolve with that of society. Globalisation has contributed to the changing influence of the state on individuals and their interactions.

Overview
The rubric cultural anthropology is generally applied to ethnographic works that are holistic in approach, are oriented to the ways in which culture affects individual experience, or aim to provide a rounded view of the knowledge, customs, and institutions of a people. Cultural anthropology focuses on how individuals make sense of the world around them using knowledge, beliefs, morals, arts, laws and customs of groups.

Social anthropology is a term applied to ethnographic works that attempt to isolate a particular system of social relations such as those that comprise domestic life, economy, law, politics, or religion, give analytical priority to the organizational bases of social life, and attend to cultural phenomena as somewhat secondary to the main issues of social scientific inquiry.

Sociocultural anthropology, which is understood to include linguistic anthropology, is concerned with the problem of difference and similarity within and between human populations. The discipline arose through the expansion of European colonial empires, and its practices and theories have been questioned and reformulated along with processes of decolonization. Such issues have re-emerged as transnational processes have challenged the centrality of the nation-state to theorizations about culture and power. New challenges have emerged as public debates about multiculturalism and the increasing use of the culture concept outside of the academy and among peoples studied by anthropology.

History 
The synergy of sociology and anthropology was initially developed during the early 1920s by European scholars. Both disciplines shared a common search for a science of society. During the 20th century, the disciplines diverged further to as cultural studies were integrated, centralising geographical and methodological features.

1920s-50s 

‘Social’ and ‘cultural’ anthropology was developed in the 1920s. It was associated with the social sciences and linguistics rather than the human biology and archaeology studied in anthropology. Specialists in the respective fields of social and cultural anthropology were elemental in the foundations of the later developed synergy. Radcliffe-Brown and Bronislaw Malinowski marked the point of differentiation between social and cultural anthropology in 1930, evident in texts from this period. In the 1930s and 40s, an influx of monographs and comparative studies of ‘tribal societies’ emerged. Meyer Fortes and Edward Evans Pritchard described and classified African societies in African Political Systems (1940). Their comparative anthology aimed to provide a basis for sociological knowledge by classifying kin-based bans instead of relying on empirical observation.

Claude Lévi-Strauss, used structuralism as a way to analyse cultural systems in terms of their structural relations, including that of kinship. In 1949, he attempted to classify marriage systems from diverse locations. Structuralism was applied to anthropology by Lévi-Strauss to reaffirms the coexistence between the individual and society and categorise information about cultural systems by the formal relationships among their elements. Structuralism remains a central concept involved in the study of sociocultural anthropology.

1960s-90s 
Before WWII, ‘social’ anthropology and ‘cultural’ anthropology were still separate entities in the field. The war called upon anthropologists from all countries to assist in the war effort. Anthropologists were extensively involved in resettlements in Europe and consulting issues of racial status in occupied areas. Ethical issues surrounding the allies involvement were topical among anthropologists and institutional development and practiced methodologies were altered by programs in ‘developing countries’. As developing countries grew independence, they grew a dislike for an apparent imperialistic nature of anthropological studies, declining work in the field. After the war, anthropologists collaborated ideas and methodologies to form the collective ‘sociocultural anthropology’. Topical interests included that of religion, kingship, acculturation, function, and community studies.

During the 1970s public spending was increased in most industrialised counties which expanded social rights, produced dramatic rises in wealth, living standards and overall equity. This neoliberal globalisation movement followed through until the 1990s. Increased spending assisted to provide academic opportunity in anthropology during 1974-90. After this period, a steady decline in anthropology opportunity is the continued trend. The drastic growth of students in Ph.D. and M.A. programs, decline in university funding, downward shift in birth rates and decreased government funding are contributors to anthropologies current state.

2000s to present 
Traditional methodologies used to study sociocultural anthropology have changed with the shift in culture in modernised society. Individuals undergo daily routines differing to that of previous decades. Individuals participate in minority groups within which only certain aspects relate to the broader national culture. Anthropologists are unable to receive a holistic ethnography, as individuals return to the private sphere after interacting within their minority groups. Impacts of globalisation, neoliberalism, and capitalism have contributed to the decline in anthropology field work.

The job market of the 2000s is centralised around those occupations that are income generating, reducing the number of university students in the social science fields. In accordance, universities have reduced funding for many anthropological programs. The 2008 global financial crisis enhanced this effect as universities had to decline spending as income generation was lesser. Decreased spending in the anthropological sector in combination with an increasing trend of anthropology university students has results in decreasing job opportunities.

Sociocultural anthropological study of the 21st century, produces facts created by an intersection of cultural classification systems and heterogenous and dynamic societies. A contributor to this dynamic societal environment is the media. The influence of the media produces accessibility for all to gather experience and evidence, however charged political conditions sway social discourse. Anthropologists use theory such as structuralism to decipher epistemological obstacles. Considering that systems are defined by the laws of their constitutive elements rather than the content alone is a lens through which modern society is studied.

Theoretical foundations

Concepts 
Sociocultural anthropology divides into a broader national level and minority of subcultural groups to ethnographically study societies and cultures. The national culture is emitted through formally organised institutions including those of government forms and legal systems, economic institution, religious organisation, educational systems, law enforcement and military organisations. National achievements are influential on sociocultural integration however can be limited to upper class relevance only. Subcultural segments are groups of individuals behaving within the national culture. Subcultural groups are observed through vertical lens, differentiation because of national development, and horizontal lens, class and occupational divisions structured by societal hierarchy.

Human Migration 
Human migration is a topic of anthropology which produced a macro and micro impact on society and its culture. Human migration is ‘the movement of persons away from their place of usual residence, either across an international boarder or within a state’. An interplay of social, political, economic, demographic, cultural and geographical factors remain central to the movement of individuals. Boas (1920) in his article The Methods of Ethnology (1920) states that it is the migration and dissemination of peoples rather than evolution that provides the basis for ethological research. Migration is accepted as the cause for the similarities of languages the dissemination of ideas and inventions across continents.The process of migration is responsible for the carrying of culture whilst the adaptation of culture to societies in different environments.

Linguistics 
The discipline of linguistics is interrelated with the study of society and culture. Both fields share a common intellectual origin in 19th Century scholarship as archaeologists and early folklorists looked for origins of culture in folktales and shared memory. These early anthropologists narrowly focused on the influence structural codes had on the distinction between communities. The comparison of societies prompted early linguistic enquiries. In the 20th century, there became a distinction between linguistic anthropology and formal linguistics, with greater focus placed on the cultural and behaviour lens of language. Formal linguistics remains to be studied through a cognitive viewpoint. Linguistic anthropology looks at how language is used in the social and cultural life of people in different societies.Speech is used in societies as a system to indicate the series of certain events and how role relations effect such events.

Sociology 
Sociocultural integration studies the interaction of the spheres and draws comparisons with alternate societies and cultures. Sociocultural anthropology is closely aligned with sociology sharing theoretical generalisation for social science and reflection of human lives. The 20th Century saw the separation of the two as differences in research topics, geographic focus and methodological emphasis diverged. Commonly, sociocultural anthropology centralises study of broader political, ethical, and economic subjects within small-scale societies whereas sociology looks at societies as a whole. Sociologically trained ethnographers have less regard for anthropological theory and place greater emphasis on empirical data. Recently, the two have reconverged as globalisation has aligned subject ideas and methodologies.

Methodologies 
The traditional anthropological research method is to gather what people say and do through initial observations. Participant observation hinges on a synthesis of subjective insider and outsider elements. Insider elements rely on the fieldworker to learn what behaviour means to the people. Outsider elements are gathered through observations and experiences drawing comparisons with internal cultural customs and behaviours with alternate cultures. These observations are transferred into a monograph of elements sorted by importance and studied in relation to anthropological theories or questions. The process is controlled, and a hypothesis is tested reporting results after every return. Alternatively, the process may be more fortuitous if unique or unexpected events occur, and the writing processes is extended to make sense of elements.

Since the 1960s, anthropologists have recognised the importance of collaboration through reflections of experiences in the field, relationships with informants and contexts used to gather material. The reflections provide a better understanding for readers of ethnographic texts and anthropologists in practicing with awareness of their own biases and emotions when writing. This has led to advancements in the field of sociocultural anthropology.

The Marxist and Structuralist theories are methods for gathering anthropological information are being challenged. Marxism validifies the necessity for conventional field work, exploring the intersection between empirical observation and theoretical frameworks with the aim of improving each. Lévi-Straussian structuralists (Lévi-Strauss 1969) are more concerned with theoretical structures.

See also
 Kluckhohn and Strodtbeck's values orientation theory
Claude Lévi-Strauss's Structuralism
Human Migration
Linguistics
Sociology

References

Further reading
 

Social anthropology
Cultural anthropology
Ethnography
Linguistics